

Buenos Aires Lake is a lake in the Beni Department, Bolivia. At an elevation of 206 m, its surface area is 7.6 km².

Lakes of Beni Department